Mikhail Mikhaylovich Pleshkov, Jr. (6 March 1885 – 12 November 1956) was a Russian Empire equestrian and military officer. He competed in jumping at the 1912 Summer Olympics and finished 21st individually and fifth with the Russian team.

Pleshkov was the son of Russian general Mikhail Mikhaylovich Pleshkov Sr. He served in Russian cavalry and took part in World War I. On 30 December 1915 he received the rank of colonel, and starting from 1917 was acting as regiment commander, reaching the rank of general-major by 1919–20. During those years of the Russian Civil War, he was one of the leaders of the White movement in the Far East, and after its fall emigrated from Russia. He died in 1956 in the United States.

Bibliography
Mikhail Mikhaylovich Pleshkov (1959) Мои воспоминания, Munich, 76 pp.

References

1885 births
1956 deaths
Equestrians at the 1912 Summer Olympics
Russian male equestrians
Russian military personnel of World War I
White movement generals
People of the Russian Civil War
White Russian emigrants to the United States